Pakra is a river in western Slavonia and central Croatia, a left tributary of the Ilova.

Pakra rises in the south of Ravna Gora, north of the village of Bučje. It flows towards the west and passes through Pakrac, where a southward bend takes it through Lipik. It continues to the west and passes Banova Jaruga. It flows southwest into the Ilova.

Several tributaries join the river: Braneška rijeka, Kopanjica, Sivornica, Rakovac, Brusnica and Bijela.

Sources
 

Rivers of Croatia
Slavonia
Landforms of Požega-Slavonia County
Landforms of Sisak-Moslavina County